Michael Dewayne McDonald (born February 13, 1969) is a retired American basketball player. McDonald played college basketball for Utah Valley and New Orleans. He played one game in the NBA for the Charlotte Hornets.

Career 
A 6'10" and  center, McDonal played collegiately for Utah Valley State College (now Utah Valley University) and the University of New Orleans. In 1990–91, he averaged 12.3 points and 8.3 rebounds for Utah Valley. After sitting out a year due to his transfer, he averaged 4.2 points and 2.5 rebounds per game for New Orleans as a junior in 1992-93. During his senior year in 1994-95, he averaged 11.1 points and 9.7 rebounds with 81 blocked shots.

McDonald was selected by the Golden State Warriors with the second round pick (55th overall) in the 1995 NBA Draft. The Warriors traded his rights, as well as the rights to Dwayne Whitfield and Martin Lewis, and forwards Victor Alexander and Carlos Rogers, to the Toronto Raptors in a trade for B. J. Armstrong. McDonald spent two weeks with the Raptors during the 1996 pre-season but was waived before the regular season started.

On January 21, 1998, McDonald signed a ten-day contract with the Charlotte Hornets. He played in one game for them.

McDonald was selected as the Continental Basketball Association (CBA) Defensive Player of the Year with the Grand Rapids Hoops in the 1997–98 season.

References 

1969 births
Living people
AEL Limassol B.C. players
American expatriate basketball people in Croatia
American expatriate basketball people in Cyprus
American expatriate basketball people in France
American expatriate basketball people in Greece
American expatriate basketball people in Japan
American expatriate basketball people in Russia
American expatriate basketball people in Turkey
American men's basketball players
Basketball players from Texas
BC Dynamo Moscow players
BC UNICS players
Centers (basketball)
Charlotte Hornets players
Fort Wayne Fury players
Golden State Warriors draft picks
Grand Rapids Hoops players
Grand Rapids Mackers players
Junior college men's basketball players in the United States
KK Zadar players
New Orleans Privateers men's basketball players
People from Longview, Texas
PBC Lokomotiv-Kuban players
SeaHorses Mikawa players
Sporting basketball players
Utah Valley Wolverines men's basketball players